Burak is a Turkish masculine name that derives from the Arabic Buraq, which literally means "lightning" and refers to a creature that transports prophets in Islamic tradition.

Given name
 Burak Akcapar (born 1967), Turkish diplomat
 Burak Bekdil, Turkish columnist
 Burak Dakak (born 1998), Turkish actor
 Burak Deniz (born 1991),Turkish actor
 Burak Eldem (born 1961), Turkish journalist
 Burak Güven (born 1975), Turkish  musician
 Burak Haşhaş (born 2006), Turkish carom billiard player
 Burak Kaplan (born 1990), Turkish footballer 
 Burak Özçivit (born 1984) Turkish actor
 Burak Özdemir (CZN Burak), Turkish chef
 Burak Uygur (born 1995), Turkish karateka
 Burak Yeter (born 1982), Turkish Dutch DJ, record producer and remixer
 Burak Yılmaz (born 1985), Turkish footballer

Middle name
 Ahmet Burak Erdoğan (born 1979), son of Turkish president Recep Tayyip Erdoğan
 Tevfik Burak Babaoğlu (born 1993), Turkish foil fencer

Surname
 Sevim Burak (1931–1983), Turkish writer

See also
 

Turkish masculine given names
Turkish-language surnames